Naval Station Norfolk is a United States Navy base in Norfolk, Virginia, that is the headquarters and home port of the U.S. Navy's Fleet Forces Command. It is the world's largest naval station, with the largest concentration of U.S. Navy forces through 75 ships alongside 14 piers and with 134 aircraft and 11 aircraft hangars at the adjacently operated Chambers Field. Port Services controls more than 3,100 ships' movements annually as they arrive and depart their berths.

Air Operations conducts over 100,000 flight operations each year, an average of 275 flights per day or one every six minutes. Over 150,000 passengers and 264,000 tons of mail and cargo depart annually on Air Mobility Command (AMC) aircraft and other AMC-chartered flights from the airfield's AMC Terminal.

History

The area where the base is located was the site of the original 1907 Jamestown Exposition.

In 1915, the Headquarters of the 5th Naval District was established. In April 1917, shortly after the United States entered World War I, a bill was passed for the purchase of the land, and money was set aside in the amount of $1.6 million for the development of the base. The Naval Operating Base (NOB) and other facilities were established. By 1918, there were 34,000 enlisted men at the base. However, by the war's end, the base was reduced in personnel and put into a "standby mode."

When World War II began in Europe in 1939, the base became more active again. New facilities were built, including new runways for aircraft, part of Naval Air Station Norfolk. It also had ramps built to be used by seaplanes to be operated by the Navy during the war. About 400 acres was acquired and, by 1943, the air station had become a central airfield for operations. Due to the expansion, it contributed to ending the war because of the training it provided to naval air units.

In March 1946, the Chief of Naval Operations ordered the Commandant of the 5th Naval District to place NOB Norfolk and NAS Norfolk as separate installations under the command of Commandant Naval Base, whose title was soon changed to Commander, Navy Region, Mid-Atlantic.

Following World War II, NOB Norfolk became the primary base of the Atlantic Fleet.  It was one of the largest naval bases in the world.

On 1 January 1953, the name of the naval base was officially changed to Naval Station Norfolk (NS Norfolk), after being known as the NOB.

In 1968, the Naval Air Station was given a major role in John F. Kennedy's vision of putting a man on the moon. The air station became Recovery Control Center Atlantic, which provided command, control, and communications for the ships and aircraft that participated in the recovery operations of Apollo 7.

Due to the end of the Cold War, a drawdown began in the 1990s, and the Navy began reducing shore installations to help with operating costs. Due to this, the Navy merged the separate Naval Station Norfolk and Naval Air Station Norfolk into a single installation to be called Naval Station Norfolk, which became official on 5 February 1999.

Following the attack on USS Cole and 11 September 2001 terrorist attacks, the base had some major upgrades to its security gates, costing more than $12.5 million.

On 26 January 2017, NS Norfolk celebrated its centennial at the Pennsylvania House, a historical building built for the Jamestown Exposition, located on the base.

Incidents
On Easter (3 April) of 1988, members of the anti-nuclear group Plowshares boarded the battleship  with visitors for a ship's tour and left their group to do symbolic damage to the ship's empty Tomahawk missile launchers, using hammers and their own blood.

On March 24, 2014, a shooting at NS Norfolk resulted in the death of a sailor and a civilian. The shooting occurred around 11:20 p.m. EDT aboard . Security forces shot and killed the civilian who had allegedly shot the sailor aboard the vessel. The base was closed for a short time after the shooting on USS Mahan.

Damaged aircraft include the MH-60 Seahawk and MH-53E Sea Dragon, according to the Navy.

Operational Units
Naval Station Norfolk is home port of four carrier strike groups and their assigned ships. In addition, the Naval Station plays host to several Military Sealift Command ships, as well as the submarines of the Atlantic Fleet.

As of October 2022, the following operational units are headquartered or homeported at Naval Station Norfolk:

Carrier Strike Groups (CARSTRKGRU)
 Carrier Strike Group Two 
 Carrier Strike Group Eight
 Carrier Strike Group Ten
 Carrier Strike Group Twelve

Destroyer Squadrons (DESRONS)
 Destroyer Squadron 2
 Destroyer Squadron 22
 Destroyer Squadron 26
 Destroyer Squadron 28

Submarine Squadron (SUBRON)
 Submarine Squadron 6

Aircraft carriers

Cruisers 
 
 
 
 
 †
 †

Submarines

Military sealift command

Air Squadrons

Tenant/Shore Commands
In addition to the several operational units, Naval Station Norfolk is also headquarters to a number of shore activities that provided administrative and specialty support to regional operational assets, and in some cases, the entire Navy.

As of June 2021, these included:
Navy Warfare Development Command
Navy Region Mid-Atlantic
United States Second Fleet
Carrier Strike Group Four
Navy Expeditionary Combat Command
Naval Reserve Force
Navy Fleet Readiness Centers
Naval Surface Force Atlantic
Naval Computer and Telecommunications Area Master Station Atlantic (NCTAMS LANT)
Navy Exchange Command
Naval Safety Center
Naval Criminal Investigative Service, Norfolk Field Office headquarters and NCIS Resident Agency (NCISRA) Norfolk, a subordinate component of the Norfolk Field Office.
Commander Navy Installations Command, N6 and N8

See also
Commodore Levy Chapel
United States Navy submarine bases

References

External links

 
 Flagship - military-authorized newspaper of NAS Norfolk and Commander Navy Region Mid-Atlantic
 NS Norfolk at GlobalSecurity.org
 
 

Naval Stations of the United States Navy
Norfolk
Installations of the United States Navy in Virginia
1917 establishments in Virginia
Military in Norfolk, Virginia
Military Superfund sites
Superfund sites in Virginia